The Coventry armoured car (AFVW19) was a British four wheel drive (4 × 4) armoured fighting vehicle developed at the end of the Second World War as a potential replacement for the lighter Humber and Daimler armoured cars.

Development

The Coventry was a combined effort between Daimler Company and the Rootes Group to produce a standard armoured car design.

The Coventry was an advanced design and featured a similar layout to the more compact Daimler, but with a more conventional suspension and drive system. It included duplicate driving controls to allow rapid disengagement in combat. There were two production versions. The Mark 1 employed a three-man turret with a 40mm QF 2-pounder gun and a 7.92 mm coaxial Besa machine gun.

The prototypes from Daimler and Humber were produced with a 2-pounder gun. In 1943, orders were placed for 1,700 vehicles that were to be able to carry the 57mm QF 6-pounder gun. A version - AFVW90 - with a larger turret with a 75 mm gun but one fewer crewman was planned and 900 of these ordered.

Deliveries of the Coventry Mk 1, from the Humber assembly line, began in June 1944 and 63 vehicles had been produced by the end of the year. It was decided, in 1943, that production of the Daimler would be continued instead of the Coventry armoured car replacing it. As a result, the order for the 2-pounder Coventry was reduced to 300 that would be sent to India. The 75 mm armed Mark II did not enter production.

Output concluded with a further 220 vehicles in 1945. The Coventry was deployed by the British Army, but they arrived too late for wartime service. Some of these units were sold to France and later saw action against the Viet Minh during the Indochina War.

References

Sources
 
 Leland Ness (2002) Jane's World War II Tanks and Fighting Vehicles: The Complete Guide, HarperCollins, London and New York,

External links
  Photo gallery at chars-francais.net

World War II armoured cars
World War II armoured fighting vehicles of the United Kingdom
Reconnaissance vehicles
Armoured cars of the United Kingdom
Military vehicles introduced from 1940 to 1944